Doyle M. Heffley is an American politician and consultant, and member of the Republican Party. In 2010, he was elected to represent the 122nd District in the Pennsylvania House of Representatives. He ran for position in 2008 against incumbent Keith McCall and lost. Won the spot in 2010 Election after McCall retired and did not run for reelection. 
Pennsylvania House of Representatives, District 122
Candidates	Votes	Percent
Keith McCall (D)	16,981	64.0%
Doyle M. Heffley (R)	9,549	36.0%

Heffley currently sits on the Appropriations, Human Services, Tourism & Recreational Development, and Transportation committees.

References

External links
State Representative Doyle Heffley official caucus website
Doyle Heffley (R) official PA House website
Doyle Heffley for State Representative official campaign website

Republican Party members of the Pennsylvania House of Representatives
Living people
21st-century American politicians
Year of birth missing (living people)